A Fading Summer is an EP by The Clientele. The EP was issued in 2000 on March Records. It was re-issued in 2003 on Merge Records.

Track listing

References

2000 EPs
The Clientele albums